The consensus 1946 College Basketball All-American team, as determined by aggregating the results of four major All-American teams.  To earn "consensus" status, a player must win honors from a majority of the following teams: the Helms Athletic Foundation, Converse, The Sporting News, and True Magazine.

1946 Consensus All-America team

Individual All-America teams

See also
 1945–46 NCAA men's basketball season

References

NCAA Men's Basketball All-Americans
All-Americans